Muramic acid is an amino sugar acid.  In terms of chemical composition, it is the ether of lactic acid and glucosamine. It occurs naturally as N-acetylmuramic acid in peptidoglycan, whose primary function is a structural component of many typical bacterial cell walls..

References 

Sugar acids
Amino sugars